"The Playroom" was an American television play broadcast on October 10, 1957, as part of the second season of the CBS television series Playhouse 90. Tad Mosel wrote the teleplay. Franklin Schaffner directed, Martin Manulis was the producer, Dominick Dunne was the assistant to the producer, and Albert Heschong was the art director. Mike Todd was the host, and Tony Randall, Nina Foch, and Patricia Neal starred.

Plot
Three children, a lawyer, an actress, and the founder of a college, return home when their mother wins a "Mother of the Year" award from a magazine.

Cast
The following performers received screen credit for their performances:

 Tony Randall - Kenneth Rutherford
 Nina Foch - Mrs. Dorothy Kelly
 Patricia Neal - Margaret Flood
 Marilyn Erskine - Katherine Rutherford
 Charles Drake - George Rutherford
 Mildred Dunnock - Mrs. Millie Rutherford
 Nora Marlowe - Mrs. Beal
 Lewis Martin - Toastmaster
 Florida Freibus - Woman Reporter
 Dennis King Jr. - Clerk
 Therese Lyon - Messenger
 Julia Meade
 Robert Ruark
 Doak Walker

References

1957 television plays
1957 American television episodes
Playhouse 90 (season 2) episodes